Tsehai Loves Learning (Amharic: ፀሀይ መማር ትወዳለች) is an Ethiopian children's television series produced by Whiz Kids Workshop which is owned by husband-and-wife Bruktawit Tigabu and Shane Etzenhouser. It premiered on 17 September 2006. The show's characters are a giraffe puppet and similar animated characters speaking the local language of Amharic, with translations into seven languages. It reaches an estimated 2,800,000 to 5,000,000 children. It was introduced to the US and Europe by the Dawn Breakers International Film Festival in 2008.

In June 2008, the show won the "Next Generation" prize at the Prix Jeunesse International. In October that year, the show won the Japan Prize International Contest for Educational Media's award for world's best educational pre-school media. It won two major awards in Asia.

Premise
Centered around the titular character portrayed by giraffe sock, it was commissioned to support the Ministry of Education for 1st and 4th grade. The show reaches over five million children aged 3–10 each week.

Tsehai Loves Learning broadcast mainly on three networks. Initially it aired on EBC and on Amhara Television. The Ministry of Education channel is the mainstream network.

The show modelled American television series Sesame Street, in which the puppet could interact with backdrop environments and using letters, numbers and shapes. According to creator, it is used to help children's visual understanding and reading skills. By implementing traditional graphical art, it creates awareness of Ethiopian culture. Tsehai Loves Learning is the first Ethiopian television show to use puppets and animation. The show also offers awareness of subjects facing the country: child slaves and orphanages.

Recognition
The show earned awards, including a 6,000 euro prize, and sponsorship by Australian Children's Television Foundation, BBC, Disney Germany, KRO, Nickelodeon International, and ZDF.
 
In June 2008, the show won the "Next Generation" prize at the Prix Jeunesse International, an awards ceremony aimed towards children's television. In October, the show won the Japan Prize International Contest for Educational Media's award for world's best educational pre-school media. It won two major awards in Asia.

According to Etzenhouser "the Prix Jeunesse prize recognized 'Tsehai Loves Learning' for its social impact as well as the quality of the production relative to its low budget. The Japan Prize focuses on the educational value of the content, so 'Tsehai' has now been recognized internationally for quality, social impact, and educational value."

UNESCO planned to support four programs. Private company Jolly Jus distributes DVDs.

Franchise

References

External links
 Official website

2006 television series debuts
Ethiopian television series
Children's education television series
Television series about animals
Television series about children
Television shows featuring puppetry
Amharic-language television